In mathematics, a linear operator T on a vector space is semisimple if every T-invariant subspace has a  complementary T-invariant subspace; in other words, the vector space is a semisimple representation of the operator T. Equivalently, a linear operator is semisimple if the minimal polynomial of it is a product of distinct irreducible polynomials.

A linear operator on a finite dimensional vector space over an algebraically closed field is semisimple if and only if it is diagonalizable.

Over a perfect field, the Jordan–Chevalley decomposition expresses an endomorphism  as a sum of a semisimple endomorphism s and a nilpotent endomorphism n such that both s and n are polynomials in x.

See also 
Jordan–Chevalley decomposition

Notes

References

 
 

Linear algebra
Invariant subspaces